The Heym Express Magnum is a luxury bolt-action rifle designed for the purpose of hunting big game. The rifle is available in 5 different calibers from the .375 H&H Magnum to the powerful .450 Rigby. Rather similar in appearance to the Karabiner 98k (even if more massive and with an exposed barrel), they use a Mauser-type bolt akin to the one of the aforesaid rifle, even though the bolt is much more solid in order to better handle the huge recoil. 
They are fitted with a 1-inch (25.4 mm) rubber recoil pad, and they have iron sights fitted on the barrel, but they can take a scope sight on the receiver.

Models
Heym Safari Express
Heym Safari Express Light
(1988-2012)
Heym Express by Martini (2013–present)

See also
Kar 98k
Mauser Gewehr 1898

References

Bolt-action rifles
Rifles of Germany